Arab Argentine refers to Argentine citizens or residents whose ancestry traces back to various waves of immigrants, largely of Arab ethnic, cultural and linguistic heritage and/or identity originating mainly from what is now Lebanon and Syria, but also some individuals from the twenty-two countries which comprise the Arab world such as Palestine, Egypt and Morocco. Arab Argentines are one of the largest Arab diaspora groups in the world.

Although a highly diverse group of Argentines — in ancestral origins, religion and historic identities — Arab Argentines hold a common identity in the Argentinian consciousness, being universally known as "turcos" ("Turks"), like in the rest of Latin American countries.

The majority of the Arab Argentines are from either Lebanese or Syrian background with a smaller amount of Palestinian, Egyptian and Moroccan background. The interethnic marriage in the Arab community, regardless of religious affiliation, is very high; most community members have only one parent who has Arab ethnicity. As a result of this, the Arab community in Argentina shows marked language shift away from Arabic. Only a few speak any Arabic and such knowledge is often limited to a few basic words. Instead the majority, especially those of younger generations, speak Spanish as a first language, and have thoroughly assimilated in the local culture, Arab Argentines have been a regular presence and distinguished themselves in all walks of national life on a par with the rest of the country's melting pot population.

History
There are some indications that the Arab Muslim presence within present day Argentinian territory dates back to the time of the Spanish exploration and conquest. The first mentioned Arab settlers were the 15th century's Moorish (Morisco) Muslims of the Iberian peninsula that were people of Arab North African descent who explored the Americas with Spanish explorers, many of them settling in Argentina who were fleeing from persecution such as the Spanish Inquisition.

However, in the 19th century Argentina saw the first real wave of Arabs to settle within its territory. Most of the Arabs who came during this time period were from Lebanon and Syria as a result of the 1860 Mount Lebanon civil war (During that time, Lebanon and Syria were Ottoman provinces). While Arab communities existed by 1864, systematic records did not appear before 1868. From 1891 to 1920, 367,348 people of Arabic heritage immigrated into Argentina. When they were first processed in the ports of Argentina, they were classified as Turks (Spanish Turcos) because what is modern day Lebanon and Syria was a territory of the Turkish Ottoman Empire, hence the popular (and erroneous) demonym (comparable to others applied in the majority immigrant country to other groups, such as "tano" (Italian) "gallego" (Spaniard) "ruso" (Jew) etc.

The causes for Arabs to leave their homeland were an accelerated increase in demographics in Lebanon, the persecution by the Ottoman Turks and the Italo-Turkish War. The Arab immigrants settled in the provinces of Buenos Aires, Córdoba, Salta, Jujuy, Tucumán, La Rioja, San Juan, Mendoza, Santiago del Estero, Misiones, Chaco, and the Patagonia. A large percentage on Arabs settled in the Cuyo region (which is made up of the provinces of San Juan, San Luis, Mendoza, and La Rioja) whose landscape and crops (olive, vineyards) resemble at time the Middle East's.

Notable people

 Jorge Antonio
 Julio Asad
 Omar Asad
 Yamil Asad
 Alfredo Avelín
 Alejandro Awada
 Juliana Awada
 Carlos Balá
 Elias Bazzi
 Lucia Caram
 Yamila Díaz
 Basilio Lami Dozo
 Eduardo Falú
 Juan Falú
 Daniel Hadad
 Omar Hasan
 Alberto Hassan
 Claudio Husaín
 Darío Husaín
 Juan Luis Manzur
 Carlos Menem
 Eduardo Menem
 Antonio Mohamed
 Daniel Mustafá
 Javier Muñoz (Argentine footballer)
 Ramón Saadi
 Vicente Saadi
 Elías Sapag
 Felipe Sapag
 Luz Sapag
 Mohamed Alí Seineldín
 Zulema Yoma

See also

 Asian Argentines
 Argentines
 Immigration to Argentina
 Arab diaspora
 Lebanese diaspora
 Lebanese Argentines
 Syrian Argentines
 Lebanese Americans
 Lebanese Canadians
 Lebanese Australians
 Lebanese Brazilians
 Lebanese British
 Arab Brazilians
 Islam in Argentina
 Latin American Muslims
 Islamic Organization of Latin America
 Moriscos

References

External links
 The History of Arab Argentines at Internet Web Archive

 
Ethnic groups in Argentina